Odontadenia is a genus of plant in the family Apocynaceae, first described as a genus in 1841. It is native to southern Mexico, Central America, South America, and the West Indies.

Species
 Odontadenia anomala (Van Heurck & Müll.Arg.) J.F.Macbr. - Peru, Bolivia
 Odontadenia campanulata J.F.Morales - Colombia
 Odontadenia funigera Woodson - Venezuela, Colombia, Ecuador, Peru, Brazil
 Odontadenia geminata (Hoffmanns. ex Roem. & Schult.) Müll.Arg. - 3 Guianas, Venezuela, Colombia, Ecuador, Peru, Bolivia, N Brazil
 Odontadenia glauca Woodson - Amazonas State in S Venezuela
 Odontadenia gracilipes (Stadelm.) Woodson - Minas Gerais
 Odontadenia hypoglauca (Stadelm.) Müll.Arg.  - Bolivia, Brazil
 Odontadenia killipii Woodson - French Guiana, Venezuela, Colombia, Ecuador, Peru, N Brazil
 Odontadenia kochii Pilg. - Guyana, Venezuela, Colombia, Ecuador, Peru, N Brazil
 Odontadenia laxiflora (Rusby) Woodson - Peru, Bolivia, N Brazil
 Odontadenia lutea (Vell.) Markgr. - Peru, Bolivia, Brazil
 Odontadenia macrantha (Roem. & Schult.) Markgr. - Oaxaca, Chiapas, Central America, Trinidad & Tobago, 3 Guianas, Venezuela, Colombia, Ecuador, Peru, Brazil
 Odontadenia markgrafiana J.F.Morales - French Guiana, N Brazil
 Odontadenia matogrossana J.F.Morales - Goiás, Mato Grosso
 Odontadenia nitida (Vahl) Müll.Arg. - Trinidad & Tobago, 3 Guianas, Venezuela, Colombia, Ecuador, Peru, Brazil, Bolivia
 Odontadenia perrottetii (A.DC.) Woodson - Venezuela, Colombia, Brazil, Bolivia, Guyana, French Guiana
 Odontadenia polyneura (Urb.) Woodson - Hispaniola
 Odontadenia puncticulosa (Rich.) Pulle - Central America, 3 Guianas, Venezuela, Colombia, Ecuador, Peru, Brazil, Bolivia
 Odontadenia stemmadeniifolia Woodson - Venezuela, Colombia, Ecuador, Peru, Brazil
 Odontadenia verrucosa (Willd. ex Roem. & Schult.) K.Schum. ex Markgr. - 3 Guianas, Venezuela, Colombia, Ecuador, Peru, Brazil, Bolivia, Panama, Costa Rica, Nicaragua

formerly included
 Odontadenia cuspidata Rusby = Mandevilla cuspidata (Rusby) Woodson
 Odontadenia duckei Markgr. = Mandevilla pohliana (Stadelm.) A.H.Gentry
 Odontadenia glandulosa (Ruiz & Pav.) K.Schum. = Mandevilla glandulosa (Ruiz & Pav.) Woodson
 Odontadenia macrocalyx (Müll.Arg.) Miers = Tabernaemontana macrocalyx Müll.Arg.

References

Apocynaceae genera
Odontadenieae